Stefanus may refer to:

 A variation of the given name Stephen, particularly in regard to:
 Saint Stephen, first martyr of Christianity
 St. Stefanus, Ghent, a Catholic church in Belgium dedicated to Saint Stephen
 Stefanus Prize, a human rights prize
 Stefanus Alliance International, a religious freedom and human rights organization
 Stefanus Du Toit, a South African inventor

See also
 Stephanus (disambiguation)